Arctic methane release is the release of methane from seas and soils in permafrost regions of the Arctic.  While it is a long-term natural process, methane release is exacerbated by global warming. This results in  a positive feedback cycle, as methane is itself a powerful greenhouse gas.

The Arctic region is one of the many natural sources of the greenhouse gas methane. Global warming could potentially accelerate its release, due to both release of methane from existing stores, and from methanogenesis in rotting biomass. Large quantities of methane are stored in the Arctic in natural gas deposits and as undersea clathrates. When permafrost thaws as a consequence of warming, large amounts of organic material can become available for methanogenesis and may ultimately be released as methane. Clathrates also degrade on warming and release methane directly.

Methane concentrations are 8–10% higher in the Arctic than in the Antarctic atmosphere. During cold glacier epochs, this gradient decreases to practically insignificant levels. Land ecosystems are considered the main sources of this asymmetry, although it has been suggested in 2007 that "the role of the Arctic Ocean is significantly underestimated."  Soil temperature and moisture levels have been found to be significant variables in soil methane fluxes in tundra environments.

Contribution to climate change

Due to the relatively short lifetime of atmospheric methane, its global trends are more complex than those of carbon dioxide. NOAA annual records have been updated since 1984, and they show substantial growth during the 1980s, a slowdown in annual growth during the 1990s, a plateau (including some years of declining atmospheric concentrarions) in the early 2000s and another consistent increase beginning in 2007. Since around 2018, there has been a consistent acceleration in annual methane increases, with the 2020 increase of 15.06 parts per billion breaking the previous record increase of 14.05 ppb set in 1991, and 2021 setting an even larger increase of 18.34 ppb.  

While these trends alarm climate scientists, with some suggesting that they represent a climate change feedback increasing natural methane emissions well beyond their preindustrial levels, there is currently no evidence connecting the Arctic to this recent acceleration. In fact, a 2021 study indicated that the role of the Arctic was typically overerestimated in global methane accounting, while the role of tropical regions was consistently underestimated. It suggested that tropical wetland methane emissions were the culprit behind the recent growth trend, and this hypothesis was reinforced by a 2022 paper connecting tropical terrestrial emissions to 80% of the global atmospheric methane trends between 2010 and 2019. However, the Arctic's role in global methane trends is considered very likely to increase in the future. A 2022 Nature Climate Change study lead by the GFZ German Research Centre for Geosciences covering the years since 2004 found first evidence for increasing methane emissions from a Siberian permafrost site into the atmosphere linked to warming.

Loss of permafrost

Arctic sea ice

A 2015 study concluded that Arctic sea ice decline accelerates methane emissions from the Arctic tundra, with the emissions for 2005-2010 being around 1.7 million tonnes higher than they would have been with the sea ice at 1981–1990 levels.  One of the researchers noted, "The expectation is that with further sea ice decline, temperatures in the Arctic will continue to rise, and so will methane emissions from northern wetlands."

Clathrate breakdown

Ice sheets
A 2014 study found evidence for methane cycling below the ice sheet of the Russell Glacier, based on subglacial drainage samples which were dominated by Pseudomonadota. During the study, the most widespread surface melt on record for the past 120 years was observed in Greenland; on 12 July 2012, unfrozen water was present on almost the entire ice sheet surface (98.6%). The findings indicate that methanotrophs could serve as a biological methane sink in the subglacial ecosystem, and the region was, at least during the sample time, a source of atmospheric methane. Scaled dissolved methane flux during the 4 months of the summer melt season was estimated at 990 Mg CH4. Because the Russell-Leverett Glacier is representative of similar Greenland outlet glaciers, the researchers concluded that the Greenland Ice Sheet may represent a significant global methane source. A study in 2016 concluded that methane clathrates may exist below Greenland's and Antarctica's ice sheets, based on past evidence.

Mitigation strategies 
ARPA-E has funded a research project from 2021-2023 to develop a "smart micro-flare fleet" to burn off methane emissions at remote locations.

A 2012 review article stated that most existing technologies "operate on confined gas streams of 0.1% methane", and were most suitable for areas where methane is emitted in pockets.

If Arctic oil and gas operations use Best Available Technology (BAT) and Best Environmental Practices (BEP) in petroleum gas flaring, this can result in significant methane emissions reductions, according to the Arctic Council.

Mitigation of methane emissions has greatest potential to preserve Arctic sea ice if it is implemented within the 2020s.

See also

 Arctic dipole anomaly
 Arctic peat fires
 Atmospheric methane
 Clathrate gun hypothesis
 Clathrate hydrate
 Gas hydrate pingo
 Global warming in Antarctica
 Methane chimney
 Methane clathrate
 Long-term effects of global warming
 Permafrost Carbon Cycle
 Soil respiration

References

External links
 Arctic Methane Emergency Group UK Based 'Arctic Methane Emergency Group' calling for action on Arctic methane crisis
 Last Hours Film Short film about potential for massive release of arctic methane
 Methane Tracker   Online tools to visualize atmospheric methane releases
 Film Arctic Methane: Why The Sea Ice Matters Featuring James Hansen, Peter Wadhams, and Natalia Shakhova
 Exclusive new pictures INSIDE Siberian crater Siberian Times, 2014
 Methane emissions at Esieh Lake, Washington Post, 2018
 7,000 underground gas bubbles poised to 'explode' in Arctic Siberian Times, 2017
 Climate Change in the Arctic and Model Projections (Video)
 Arctic permafrost is thawing fast. That affects us all. National Geographic, 2019
 Why the Arctic is smouldering, BBC Future, by Zoe Cormier, 2019
 , Public Broadcasting Service (PBS)

Arctic Ocean
Climate change feedbacks
Effects of climate change
Environment of the Arctic
Methane
Permafrost
Greenhouse gas emissions